Dimitrios Karypidis is a Greek paralympic swimmer.

Career
Karypidis Competed at the 2017 World Championships, winning two silver medals in backstroke events. Karypidis also competed at the 2016 and 2020 Summer Paralympics, but without winning a medal.

References

External links 
Paralympic Games profile

Living people
Place of birth missing (living people)
Year of birth missing (living people)
Greek male backstroke swimmers
Male breaststroke swimmers
Swimmers at the 2016 Summer Paralympics
Swimmers at the 2020 Summer Paralympics
Paralympic swimmers of Greece
Medalists at the World Para Swimming Championships
S1-classified Paralympic swimmers